Geoffrey Mauncell (fl. 1399) of Salisbury, Wiltshire, was an English goldsmith and politician.

He was a Member (MP) of the Parliament of England for Great Bedwyn in 1399.

References

Year of birth missing
Year of death missing
English MPs 1399
People from Wiltshire
English goldsmiths
Members of Parliament for Great Bedwyn